Multicast Listener Discovery (MLD) is a component of the Internet Protocol Version 6 (IPv6) suite. MLD is used by IPv6 routers for discovering multicast listeners on a directly attached link, much like Internet Group Management Protocol (IGMP) is used in IPv4. The protocol is embedded in ICMPv6 instead of using a separate protocol. MLDv1 is similar to IGMPv2 and MLDv2 similar to IGMPv3.

Protocol
The ICMPv6 messages use type 143.

Support
Several operating system support MLDv2:
 Windows Vista and later
 FreeBSD since release 8.0
 The Linux kernel since 2.5.68
macOS

References

Internet protocols
Internet Standards
Network layer protocols
IPv6